Segerea is an administrative ward in the Ilala District of the Dar es Salaam Region of Tanzania. According to the 2002 census, the ward has a total population of 75,821.

References

Ilala District
Wards of Dar es Salaam Region